Oraidium is a monotypic genus of butterflies in the family Lycaenidae.

Species
Oraidium barberae (Trimen, 1868)

External links
Oraidium at funet

Polyommatini
Lycaenidae genera
Taxa named by George Thomas Bethune-Baker